Alday is a surname. The Basque noble family Alday, whose coat of arms is shown at right, originated in Getxo.

Notable people with the surname include:
 Gene Alday (born 1957), American Republican politician from Mississippi
 James Alday (1516–1576?), English navigator, explorer and privateer
 John Alday (fl. 1570), English translator of semi-philosophical and classical works
 Luis Trujillo Alday (born 1993), Mexican professional footballer
 Manuel Alday Marticorena (1917–1976), Spanish footballer who played for Real Madrid
 Paul Alday (–1835), French violinist and composer resident in Ireland
 Ricardo Alday Castillo (born 1979), Mexican civil engineer

See also
 Allday (disambiguation)